Suraj Mani is an Indian rock musician, poet-philosopher, songwriter and former lead vocalist and member of the band Motherjane, and one of the prominent personalities in the field of independent music in India. He is popularly known as the 'singing sensei' and hails from Kerala, a southern state of India. He has performed with Thaikkudam Bridge, Indian Ocean, Shubha Mudgal, Indus Creed, Megadeth, Opeth, Third Eye Blind, Mr. Big etc.

He is the founder & frontman of Suraj Mani & The Tattva Trip (SMATTT) which is about a real-time, multi-sensory interaction between the artist, audience & a mythical traveller – The Tattva Tripper; who can move through time & space, see into the hearts & minds of most people, tell us their stories & sing us their songs. Apart from this Suraj Mani is also the founder CEO of Suraj Mani Engineers Pvt. Ltd, a premium HVAC firm, Aum I Artistes (media production and artist management) and founder trustee of Aum I Art Foundation (a not for profit music trust). He plays a key role in influencing the growth of independent music in India. His company Aum I Artistes is behind popular music programs, festivals, properties such as Music Mojo, Muse Room, Mojo Rising, Alt & Pepper, HOME Fest, OO Heaven, TGIIR (The Great Indian Indie Recordings) etc. He is a Mechanical Engineering graduate from TKM College of Engineering, Kollam.

Albums and releases 

 Insane Biography- Motherjane, year 2002. Produced by Aum I Artistes, this album went on to win many awards nationally. Some of the popular songs from the album – Mindstreet, Soul Corporation, Questions, Disillusioned etc.
 Maktub- Motherjane, year 2008. Produced by Aum I Artistes, this album went on to win many awards nationally and internationally. Some of the popular songs from the album- Chasing the sun, Fields of sound, Broken, Maktub, Karmic Steps etc.
 The Tattva Trip- Suraj Mani, year 2012. Produced by Aum I Artistes, this album was Suraj Mani's first solo work and featured award-winning art work and story line that inspired his onward journey as an artist. Some of the popular songs from the album- Tribes of Babel, Whole, The Gift, Rise Up, The Tattva Trip etc.
 In April 2020, Mani released the single I am Fine. In an interview. The same month in an interview Mani said that in June he would be releasing Rinse and Repeat, a four-song EP.

Awards and recognition 

 'Best Rock Vocalist in Asia' – AVIMA 2010 The World's Largest Indie Awards
 'Best Singer' – The Jack Daniels Rock Awards 08-09
 'Best Singer/Songwriter' – The Leon Ireland Award 08-09
 'Best Album Art (The Tattva Trip)' – The Jack Daniel Rock Awards 2014
 'Best Rock Act in Asia' – AVIMA 2008 The World's Largest Indie Awards
 'Rock Act of The Decade' – Rock Street Journal
 'Best Rock Album (Maktub)’- Rolling Stone Magazine 2008, Unwind Awards 2008
 'Best Rock Album (Insane Biography) – Unwind Awards 2002

References 

1972 births
Living people
Indian male singer-songwriters
Indian singer-songwriters